William Houston (born 19 July 1968), sometimes credited as Will Houston, is an English actor.

Early life and career
Born in Sussex, he grew up in Northern Ireland.

Trained at the Central School of Speech and Drama, Houston has played many leading classical stage roles, including Troilus in Troilus and Cressida, Prince Hal in both parts of Henry IV and the title roles in Henry V (for which he was nominated for an Evening Standard Theatre Award for Best Actor), Ben Jonson's Sejanus, and Coriolanus, all for the Royal Shakespeare Company; Pentheus/Agave in Sir Peter Hall's production of Euripides' Bacchai at the National Theatre. He replaced Iain Glen in the lead role in Fortune's Fool at the Old Vic from January 2014. Between May and July 2014 he played Titus in Shakespeare's Titus Andronicus directed by Lucy Bailey at Shakespeare's Globe Theatre.

In April 2009, he appeared in "Cause and Effect", the second episode of the third series of Robin Hood. He also played the character of Boucher in the BBC's adaptation of Elizabeth Gaskell's 'North and South' with Daniela Denby-Ashe and Richard Armitage. He appears in the BBC series of Casualty 1909 and 1907, as Dr. Millias Culpin.

He played Constable 'Clarky' Clarke in the 2009 film Sherlock Holmes alongside Robert Downey, Jr. and Jude Law, directed by Guy Ritchie (credited as William Houston), and reprised the role in the 2011 sequel Sherlock Holmes: A Game of Shadows. He worked with From Software to voice cast as Marvellous Chester in the DLC for 2011's Dark Souls, King Vendrick in 2014's Dark Souls 2 and its rerelease Scholar of the First Sin. He also voiced NPCs Retired Hunter Djura and the Gatekeeper in Bloodborne in 2015, and the optional boss enemy Oceiros, the Consumed King in Dark Souls III in 2016.

In 2020, he played Ted Daszkiewicz in the BBC drama The Salisbury Poisonings.

Filmography
The Odyssey (1997, TV Series) - Anticlus
The Gambler (1997) - Pasha
North and South (2004) - Boucher
Puffball (2007) - Tucker
Elizabeth: The Golden Age (2007) - Don Guerau De Spes
Casualty 1907 (2007) - Dr Milais Culpin
Fifty Dead Men Walking (2008) - Ray
Sherlock Holmes (2009) - Constable Clark
Casualty 1909 (2009) - Dr Milais Culpin
Clash of the Titans (2010) - Ammon
Age of Heroes (2011) - Mac
Sherlock Holmes: A Game of Shadows (2011) - Constable Clark
Lord of Darkness (2012) - Charlie McGuire
The Bible (2013) - Moses
Son of God (2014) - Moses
Dracula Untold (2014) - Cazan
Shakespeare's Globe: Titus Andronicus (2015) - Titus Andronicus
The Dancer (2016) - Rud
Level Up (2016) - The Businessman
Brimstone (2016) - Eli
Will (2017, TV series) - William Kempe
The Salisbury Poisonings (2020, TV series) - Ted Daszkiewicz
Amphibia (2022, TV series) - King Aldrich, The Core (voice)
Wednesday (2022, TV series) - Joseph Crackstone

References

External links

1968 births
Alumni of the Royal Central School of Speech and Drama
Male stage actors from Northern Ireland
Living people
Royal Shakespeare Company members
English male stage actors